Valentin Atangana Edoa (born 25 August 2005) is a professional footballer who plays as a defensive midfielder for Reims. Born in Cameroon, he is a youth international for France.

Club career
Atangana is a youth product of FCF La Neuvillette-Jamin, before moving to the academy of Reims in 2015. He began his senior career with the Reims reserves in 2021, and signed his first professional contract with the club on 7 May 2022. He made his professional debut with Reims as a late substitute in a 4–0 Ligue 1 win over Troyes on 12 February 2023.

International career
Born in Cameroon, Atangana moved to France at a young age and was naturalized. He played for the France U17 in the tournament winning campaign at the 2022 UEFA European Under-17 Championship.

Style of playing
Atangana Edoa is a flexible player who primarily plays as a defensive midfielder, but can also operate as a central midfielder or right-back as needed. He is a strong leader who fights defensively and helps other players shine.

Honours
France U17
UEFA European Under-17 Championship: 2022

References

External links
 
 FFF profile

2005 births
Living people
Cameroonian emigrants to France
French sportspeople of Cameroonian descent
French footballers
Footballers from Yaoundé
Association football midfielders
France youth international footballers
Cameroonian footballers
Ligue 1 players
Championnat National 2 players
Stade de Reims players